, also known as 'Aki-san', is the president and CEO of Good Smile Company. He was born in Sanuki, Kagawa Prefecture, Japan.

As the CEO of Good Smile Company he works to provide new content to fans of character figures and goods. He has also been involved in the production and planning of a number of anime series and films, which has led him to become one of the founding board members of the Ultra Super Pictures animation studio.

Career
Takanori Aki was first employed at Konami, then worked in marketing at Banpresto before deciding to create his own company. In May 2001 he established Good Smile Company as a talent agency, which later became involved in the production and distribution of sculpted products with its sister company Max Factory, after meeting with MAX Watanabe. At that time the company was not going well as a talent agency, and thus soon moved entirely into making and distributing figures instead, which is now the main focus of his company, even though he admits to never having sculpted anything himself. He also created Good Smile Racing, a division of the main company created from his passion for fast cars, which supports racing teams and produces car accessories. Takanori has been to international events around the world as a guest speaker for the industry, including Anime Expo, and Anime Festival Asia.

Anime production and planning

Aki is known for his work involving the Black Rock Shooter project, a project that expanded an illustration by huke into a series of figures as well as an animated series. He has also been credited in a number of other anime series for planning and production. Below is a list of series he has been involved in;

Aiura: Planning
Berserk: The Golden Age Arc I - The Egg of the King (movie): Executive Producer
Black Rock Shooter (OAV): Producer, Production Direction
Black Rock Shooter (TV): Executive Producer
CANAAN: Executive Producer
Croisée in a Foreign Labyrinth - The Animation: Planning
D.C.III ~Da Capo III~: Executive Producer
Dog Days: Executive Producer
Dog Days': Executive Producer
Gargantia on the Verdurous Planet: Planning
Haganai: Planning
Haganai NEXT: Planning
Hanasaku Iroha - Blossoms for Tomorrow: Executive Producer
Kimi ga Aruji de Shitsuji ga Ore de: Planning
The Legend of Heroes: Trails in the Sky (Special): Executive Producer
Senki Zesshō Symphogear: Executive Producer
Senyuu.: Executive Producer (Good Smile)
Tantei Opera Milky Holmes: Executive Producer
Tari Tari: Executive Producer
Tears to Tiara: Executive Producer

In 2012, Aki was one of the founding members of the holding company, Ultra Super Pictures. The company is an animation studio incorporating four smaller studios: Sanzigen, Ordet Films, Liden Films and TRIGGER. The companies providing capital for the company were Aki's Good Smile Company, its sister company Max Factory, Bushiroad, Nitroplus, and Pixiv.

References

External links
Good Smile Company Official Site
ULTRA SUPER PICTURES Company Information

Living people
Japanese chief executives
Japanese chairpersons of corporations
1971 births